The Disposal and Liquidation Commission was a body set up in 1921 by the British government to sell off surplus war supplies and equipment, particularly those appertaining to the Ministry of Munitions following the First World War.

References

1921 establishments in England